Franz Josef Steffens (1923–2006) was a German stage, film and television actor.

Selected filmography
 Die Verrohung des Franz Blum (1974)
 Jerusalem, Jerusalem (1979, TV series)
 The Blind Judge (1984, TV series)
 Moving Targets (1984)
 Das Erbe der Guldenburgs (1987–1990, TV series)
 The Country Doctor (1990, TV series)
 Unsere Hagenbecks (1991–1994, TV series)
 Freunde fürs Leben (1992–1997, TV series)
 Schlaraffenland (1995)
 Für alle Fälle Stefanie (1996, TV series)

References

Bibliography
 Zeno Ackermann & Sabine Schülting. Precarious Figurations: Shylock on the German Stage, 1920–2010. Walter de Gruyter, 2019

External links

1923 births
2006 deaths
German male film actors
German male stage actors
German male television actors
People from Warendorf (district)